The 1938 Nevada Wolf Pack football team was an American football team that represented the University of Nevada in the Far Western Conference (FWC) during the 1938 college football season. In their third and final season under head coach Doug Dashiell, the team compiled a 2–3–1 record (1–2 against conference opponents) and finished third in the conference.

Late in the season, Nevada players petitioned for the removal of coach Dashiell. In the final game of the season, a 51–0 loss to Amos Alonzo Stagg's Pacific Tigers, assistant coach Chet Scranton ran the team, though Dashiell continued to sit on the bench but did not direct the team. On November 1, 1938, the regents' executive committee cancelled the team's remaining three games due to turmoil within the program. Board chairman Silas Ross said: "After discussing the matter from all angles, we decided it would be persecuting the players to go through with the schedule. In view of the situation, with dissension existing, with several players out for the season with injuries and five more withdrawing from school, it seemed best for the interests of all concerned that the games be cancelled." Dashiell resigned as head coach.

Schedule

References

Nevada
Nevada Wolf Pack football seasons
Nevada Wolf Pack football